C. P. Mudalagiriyappa ( 24 June 1940) is an Indian politician and leader of Indian National Congress from Karnataka. He was a 3-time Member of Parliament (MP) and represented Chitradurga in the Lok Sabha the lower house of the Parliament of India.<re He was also a Member of the Indian Parliamentary Delegation led by the Hon'ble Speaker, Shri G.M.C. Balayogi to Iraq in 1998.

Early life and background 
Mudalagiriyappa was born on 24 June 1940 in Chiratha Halli of Tumkur District, Karnataka. Shri Pape Gowda was his father.

He completed his education in B.A. and B.L. from Government Law College and Bangalore University, Bangalore (Karnataka).

Personal life 
C. P. Mudalagiriyappa married Smt. Lakshmi Devi on 7 May 1970 and the couple has one son and one daughter.

Position held

References

People from Tumkur district
1940 births
Living people
Indian National Congress politicians 
Lok Sabha members from Karnataka
People from Chitradurga district
Indian National Congress politicians from Karnataka

India MPs 1989–1991
India MPs 1991–1996
India MPs 1998–1999
Kannada people
Indian politicians